VCH may refer to:

 Vancouver Coastal Health
 Vertical clitoral hood piercing
 Victoria County History (Victoria History of the Counties of England)
 Victoria Concert Hall
 Wiley-VCH, a publishing company
 Volunteer Centre Hackney
 Vérification Contrôle Habitat
 4-Vinylcyclohexene